Jenna Miscavige Hill (born February 1, 1984) is an American former Scientologist. After leaving the Church of Scientology in 2005, she has become an outspoken critic of the organization. She had been a third-generation Scientologist, the granddaughter of Ron Miscavige Sr. (who also left the church in 2012), the daughter of Elizabeth and Ron Miscavige Jr. (who left in 2000) and the niece of  Scientology leader David Miscavige. Her book Beyond Belief: My Secret Life Inside Scientology and My Harrowing Escape, recounting her experience growing up and living within the Scientology movement, was published by HarperCollins in 2013. She now runs a website which she co-founded with other ex-Scientologists which provides support and discussion for people either in the church or who have left.

Early life
Jenna's parents, Elizabeth and Ron Jr., joined the Sea Org, Scientology's most devout religious order when she was aged two. From then on she spent most of her childhood apart from her parents and says she was only allowed to see them once a week. At age eight she signed her own billion-year contract with Sea Org, effectively agreeing to follow their rules for life. One requirement of Sea Org was that families be separated and that "children over the age of six would be raised communally at locations close to Sea Org bases"; at age six she was moved to a Cadet Org (Sea Org for children) school called "The Ranch". At the Ranch, Hill states that in addition to rote learning of the works of L. Ron Hubbard she was expected to do heavy manual labor for 25 hours a week. She described her experience from ages five to twelve thus: "We were also required to write down all transgressions[...] similar to a sin in the Catholic religion. After writing them all down, we would receive a meter check on the electropsychometer to make sure we weren't hiding anything, and you would have to keep writing until you came up clean."
The Church of Scientology responded to the allegations in an official statement:

She has been interviewed about her experiences within Scientology by a number of media outlets, including ABC's Nightline in April 2008, and Piers Morgan Tonight in February 2013 discussing details of the church.
After leaving the Ranch in 1997 she began training in the CMO, where Hill claims she was given repeated "security checks", investigations looking for confessions of misdemeanors (known as withholds) from past and present lives. After several months she was told that her parents had left Sea Org and requested that she be allowed to leave too. Hill claims she was considered a potential risk to Scientology's public profile as David Miscavige's niece, and the confessions were taken to use against her later if she spoke out publicly.

Hill was 16 when her father and mother left Scientology in 2000.  Hill states that due to the Scientology-ordered practice of disconnection with relatives and friends who do not support Scientology or are hostile to it, letters from her parents were intercepted and she was not allowed to answer a telephone for a year.

Leaving the church
Hill met her husband, Dallas Hill, also a Scientologist, in 2001. They married soon afterwards, and later had two children. In 2004, they were sent to Australia on a church mission where they were first able to access TV and internet and became aware of criticisms of Scientology. One website was hosting Operation Clambake, dedicated to publishing critical articles and exposés of the Church of Scientology. Shortly afterwards they decided to leave the church. Jenna claims this was made difficult by the Scientology organization, which threatened Dallas with disconnection from his own family still within the church. She further claims they were pressured to sign agreements which would entitle the church to claim $10,000 each time she spoke out publicly against the church, which she refused. In 2005 they finally left the church. Hill first spoke publicly against the Church of Scientology's practice of disconnection in an open letter to Karin Pouw, the official Scientology spokesperson, in which she details how ex-members are prevented from communicating with family still in the church, in response to a prior statement from Pouw refuting allegations made in Andrew Morton's book Tom Cruise: An Unauthorized Biography. In the letter she said:

In 2013, she published her book Beyond Belief: My Secret Life Inside Scientology and My Harrowing Escape under the William Morrow imprint of HarperCollins. Jointly written with Lisa Pulitzer, a former correspondent for The New York Times, the book recounts her experience of Scientology in detail. The Church of Scientology has denied the accuracy of her account.

On February 8, 2013, while appearing on radio's Opie & Anthony Show, she stated that she first learned about the story of Xenu from watching the South Park episode "Trapped in the Closet".

Hill, along with Kendra Wiseman and Astra Woodcraft (both also raised in Scientology), founded the website exscientologykids.com, a website designed to provide a forum and information for people who have either left the church or those still within Scientology who are looking for information.

Hill's grandparents Becky and Ron Miscavige Sr. also left the church in 2012, and in 2016 Ron Sr. wrote his own memoir, Ruthless: Scientology, My Son David Miscavige, and Me. Prior to its publication, lawyers acting on behalf of David Miscavige threatened to sue the publishers for defamation.

See also
 Disconnection
 Going Clear (film)
 Operation Clambake
 Tony Ortega
 Karin Pouw
 Project Chanology
 Mike Rinder
 Scientology controversies

References

External links

 Beyond Belief: My Secret Life Inside Scientology and My Harrowing Escape at Open Library
 
 

1984 births
American former Scientologists
American whistleblowers
Critics of Scientology
Living people
People from Concord, New Hampshire